The men's downhill competition at the 2018 Asian Games was held on 20 August 2018 at the Khe Bun Hill Subang.

Schedule
All times are Western Indonesia Time (UTC+07:00)

Results 
Legend
DNF — Did not finish

Seeding run

Final

References
Results

Mountain Men